Machhalandapur railway station is on the Sealdah–Bangaon branch line. It is 53.5 km from Sealdah and is part of the Kolkata Suburban Railway system.

Maslandapur, Nokpul, Sadpur and Betpuli form a cluster of census towns, south of Gobardanga. Machhalandapur railway station serves this cluster and villages beyond it.

See also

References

External links 

 Machhalandapur Station Map

Railway stations in North 24 Parganas district
Kolkata Suburban Railway stations